Dema Union is an Union Parishad under Bagerhat Sadar Upazila of Bagerhat District in the division of Khulna, Bangladesh. It has an area of 44.21 km2 (17.07 sq mi) and a population of 24,745.

References

Unions of Bagerhat Sadar Upazila
Unions of Bagerhat District
Unions of Khulna Division